Roberto Ramírez may refer to:

 Roberto Ramírez (field hockey) (born 1957), Cuban Olympic hockey player
 Roberto Ramírez (footballer) (born 1996), Argentine footballer
 Roberto Ramírez (pitcher) (born 1972), Mexican pitcher
 Roberto Ramirez (politician) (born 1950), American politician
 Roberto Daniel Ramírez (born 1993), Mexican footballer